Ophiogomphus colubrinus, the boreal snaketail, is a species of clubtail in the dragonfly family Gomphidae. It is found in North America.

The IUCN conservation status of Ophiogomphus colubrinus is "LC", least concern, with no immediate threat to the species' survival. The population is stable. The IUCN status was reviewed in 2017.

References

Further reading

 

Ophiogomphus
Articles created by Qbugbot
Insects described in 1854